Frankton may refer to:

Places

Australia
 Frankton, South Australia

England
English Frankton, Shropshire
Frankton, Warwickshire
Lower Frankton, Shropshire; a UK location
Welsh Frankton, Shropshire; a settlement in Ellesmere Rural

New Zealand
Frankton, Hamilton, in the North Island
Frankton, Otago, in the South Island

United States
Frankton, Indiana
Frankton, Kansas

Other uses
Operation Frankton a commando raid on shipping in the German-occupied French port of Bordeaux during the Second World War
Frankton (folding boat)

See also
Frankston (disambiguation)